Baryssinus melasmus is a species of longhorn beetle in the family Cerambycidae. It was described by Monné & Martins in 1976.

References

Baryssinus
Beetles described in 1976